Thistle Cottage is a building in Luss, Argyll and Bute, Scotland. A Category C listed cottage dating to the late 19th century, it overlooks the western shore of Loch Lomond to the north of Luss Pier.

While no precise date of construction is known, the cottage did not appear on the 1868 Ordnance Survey map.

See also
List of listed buildings in Luss, Argyll and Bute

References

19th-century establishments in Scotland
Listed buildings in Luss, Argyll and Bute
Category C listed buildings in Argyll and Bute